Jattu Engineer is a 2017 Indian comedy film directed by  Gurmeet Ram Rahim Singh and Honeypreet Insan. The film was released on 19 May 2017.

Plot 

The story of "Jattu Engineer" revolves around an underdeveloped village that is struck by poverty, unemployment, and drug menace and how a teacher transforms the fate of the villagers with his deep-dyed gumption to uplift the living standards of the village. The movie will also highlight the PM Narendra Modi's dream project – Swachh Bharat Mission.

Soundtrack 
The music is composed by Gurmeet Ram Rahim Singh. The soundtrack album consists of two songs written and sung by Singh.

Release 
The film released on 19 May 2017. Reza Noorani of Times Of India rated movie with 1 star. He writes "The film is two hours of loud gags with a handful of preachy messages. Watch at your own risk, this one!".  Firstpost criticized the movie saying "Star rating: * — because there is just one star, Gurmeet Ram Rahim Singh Insaan". Even the critics of BookMyShow; popular cinema ticketing website has rated the movie with 1 star. This movie was made tax-free by the government in Rajasthan and Haryana. The shooting of this movie was completed in Just 15 days. Gurmeet Ram Rahim Singh Insaan has a total of 40 credits in the movie which includes DOP, script writing, song writing, set designing, art direction, dress designing, editing, choreography etc. The movie has two songs, one of which is based on sports, to encourage the youth to participate more actively in games rather than using drugs in this age. Both the songs are composed and sung by Gurmeet Ram Rahim Singh Insaan himself.

References

External links 
 

2010s Hindi-language films
2010s masala films
2017 comedy films
2017 films
Films set in Haryana
Indian comedy films